Marcus Livius Salinator (254 – c. 191 BC) was a Roman general and politician who fought in the Second Punic War, most notably during the Battle of the Metaurus.

Born in 254 BC, Livius was elected consul of the Roman Republic with Lucius Aemilius Paulus shortly before the Second Illyrian War in 219 BC. After leading a successful campaign against the Illyrians, he was charged with malfeasance concerning war spoils during a mission to Carthage and was tried and found guilty on his return to Rome.

After his removal as consul, he retired from public life for several years, until 210 BC. In 207 BC, during the Second Punic War, he was again elected consul (supposedly against his wishes) with Gaius Claudius Nero. Arriving in Narni, Livius attempted to block the advance of the Carthaginian army invading the Italian peninsula. Encountering Carthaginians near Fanum in the spring of 207 BC, Livius, reinforced by the army of his colleague Nero, defeated the Carthaginians in the decisive Battle of the Metaurus, killing their commander Hasdrubal, the brother of Hannibal.

Following the Roman victory, Livius returned to Rome, where he and Nero were awarded a triumph in 206 BC. Livius remained as proconsul, defending Etruria (modern day Tuscany and Umbria) between 206 and 205 BC and later Cisalpine Gaul from 204 BC until the end of the war.

Livius was elected censor, again with Gaius Claudius Nero, in 204 BC. This was marred by constant quarreling with Nero, particularly concerning a salt tax (inspiring his cognomen Salinator, which would be adopted by his descendants, including the Roman admiral Gaius Livius Salinator), as well as his vendetta against those responsible for his trial, continuing until his death several years later. Livius' wife, Calavia, was the daughter of Pacuvius Calavius, the chief magistrate of Capua in 217 BC.

Footnotes

References
Lazenby, J.F. Hannibal's War, London, 1978.

254 BC births
190s BC deaths
3rd-century BC diplomats
3rd-century BC Roman consuls
Salinator, Marcus
Roman censors
Roman commanders of the Second Punic War
Year of death uncertain